Mount Macedon  (Aboriginal Woiwurrung language: Geboor or Geburrh) is a dormant volcano that is part of the Macedon Ranges of the Great Dividing Range, located in the Central Highlands region of Victoria, Australia.

Etymology
The mountain is known as Geboor or Geburrh in the Aboriginal Woiwurrung language of the Wurundjeri people.

The mountain was sighted by Hamilton Hume and William Hovell on their 1824 expedition to Port Phillip from New South Wales. They named it Mount Wentworth. It was renamed Mount Macedon by explorer Major Thomas Mitchell who ascended the mountain in 1836. He named it after Philip of Macedon in honour of the fact that he was able to view Port Philip from the summit. Several other geographic features along the path of his third Australia Felix expedition were named after figures of Ancient Macedonia including the nearby Campaspe River and Mount Alexander near Castlemaine (named after Alexander the Great).

History 
At the base of Mount Macedon is an axe-grinding site, a large sandstone boulder with thirty-one grooves made by the sharpening of stone axes. This is an important cultural heritage site for the Wurundjeri tribe.

Summit

Camel's Hump, together with Hanging Rock and Croziers Rocks are igneous trachyte rocks of the crag and are favoured by rock climbers. The mountain has become a popular venue for sport climbing and for families, due to its proximity to Melbourne.

The view from the summit of Mount Macedon is spectacular, and takes in Melbourne city, the Dandenong Ranges and the You Yangs near Geelong.

Mount Macedon Memorial Cross
It was established in 1935 by William Cameron, an early resident of the town of Mount Macedon, as a memorial to his son and others who had died in World War I.

Climate
Total rainfall approaches  annually, reaching a maximum in winter, with minimum amounts occurring during the summer months of January to March. Snowfalls occurs on 15–20 days a year, with snow lying occurring on 10–15 days a year. As with the entire region, Mount Macedon is susceptible to severe frost, generally between the months of May and September, with light frosts throughout the rest of the year and minimal frost between January and March. Extreme minimums have been recorded near . A feature of the region in winter is the occasional appearance of black ice.

Notable events
On 8 November 1948, Douglas DC-3 VH-UZK operated by Australian National Airways crashed on Mount Macedon a few minutes after leaving Essendon Airport. The pilot and first officer died; the cabin crew and all 19 passengers survived, with relatively minor injuries. The event is commemorated on a plaque in Cross Reserve.

See also

List of mountains in Victoria
 Mount Macedon, Victoria
 Macedon, Victoria

References

External links
 RockClimbing.com
 

Mountains of Victoria (Australia)